An annular solar eclipse occurred on November 1, 1929. A solar eclipse occurs when the Moon passes between Earth and the Sun, thereby totally or partly obscuring the image of the Sun for a viewer on Earth. An annular solar eclipse occurs when the Moon's apparent diameter is smaller than the Sun's, blocking most of the Sun's light and causing the Sun to look like an annulus (ring). An annular eclipse appears as a partial eclipse over a region of the Earth thousands of kilometres wide. Annularity was visible from Spanish Sahara (today's West Sahara), French West Africa (parts now belonging to Mauritania, Mali, Burkina Faso, and southwestern tip of Benin), British Gold Coast (today's Ghana), French Togoland (today's Togo) including capital Lomé, Portuguese São Tomé and Príncipe (today's São Tomé and Príncipe), French Equatorial Africa (parts now belonging to Gabon and R. Congo) including capital Brazzaville, Belgian Congo (today's DR Congo) including capital Léopoldville, Northern Rhodesia (today's Zambia), British Tanganyika (now belonging to Tanzania) including capital Dar es Salaam, and British Seychelles (today's Seychelles) including capital Victoria.

Related eclipses

Solar eclipses of 1928–1931

Saros 132

Notes

References

1929 11 1
1929 in science
1929 11 1
November 1929 events